This is an incomplete list of past and present rugby league clubs in New Zealand

National teams

 New Zealand national rugby league team
 New Zealand Kiwiferns
 New Zealand Māori
 New Zealand Residents/New Zealand 'A'
 Junior Kiwis

NRL Club sides

 New Zealand Warriors

Defunct
 Auckland Lions
 Auckland Vulcans

Zonal teams
 Northern Districts (Swords)
 Auckland Zone
 Counties Manukau
 Wai-Coa-Bay (Stallions)
 Mid-Central
 Wellington (Orcas)
 South Island

District teams
 Northland Rugby league team (Swords)
 Auckland Rugby league team (Vulcans)
 Akarana Rugby League Team (Falcons)
 Counties Manukau Rugby League Team (Stingrays)
 Waikato Rugby league team  (Mana)
 Bay of Plenty Rugby league team (Stags)
 Coastline Rugby league team (Mariners)
 Taranaki Rugby league team (Sharks)
 Manawatu Rugby league team (Mustangs)
 Gisborne Tairawhiti Rugby league team (Lions)
 Hawkes Bay Rugby league team (Unicorns)
 Wellington Rugby league team (Orcas)
 Tasman Rugby league team (Titans)
 Canterbury Rugby league team (Bulls)
 Aoraki Rugby league team (Eels)
 West Coast Rugby league team (Chargers)
 Otago Rugby league team (Whalers)
 Southland Rugby league team (Rams)

Regional competitions

Northland

 Kaikohe Lions
 Moerewa Tigers	
 Takahiwai
 Otangarei Knights
 Hokianga Pioneers
 Portland Panthers
 Northern Wairoa Bulls	
 Horahora Broncos
 Pawarenga Broncos
 Otaua Valleys Warriors
 Otaika Eagles
 Hikurangi Stags	
 Hokianga Pioneers
 Marist United	
 Manaia RL Club
 Muriwhenua Falcons

Junior Clubs
 Whanau RL Club
 Otaika Sea Eagles

Auckland

 Ponsonby Ponies (1908)
 Manukau Magpies (1910)
 Northcote Tigers (1910)
 Otahuhu Leopards (1911)
 Ellerslie Eagles (1912)
 Richmond Bulldogs (1913)
 Marist Saints (1919)
 Pt Chevalier Pirates (1919)
 Mt Albert Lions (1928)
 Papakura Sea Eagles (1931)
 Glenora Bears (1931)
 City Newton Dragons (1948)
 Mount Wellington Warriors (1948)
 Te Atatu Roosters (1955)
 Manurewa Marlins (1960)
 Howick Hornets (1961)
 Mangere East Hawks (1963)
 Glenfied Greyhounds (1964)
 New Lynn Stags (1967)
 East Coast Bays Barracudas (1977)
 Bay Roskill Vikings (1979)
 Hibiscus Coast Raiders (1982)
 Kaipara Lancers (2011)
 Otara Scorpions
 Pakuranga Jaguars
 Papatoetoe Panthers
 Pukekohe Pythons
 Rodney Rams
 Tuakau Broncos
 Waiheke Rams
 Waitemata Seagulls
 Waiuku

Wai-Coa-Bay

Waikato

 Turangawaewae
 Taniwharau
 Ngaruawahia Panthers
 Hukanui
 Hamilton City Tigers
 Hillcrest Hornets
 Te Awamutu Firehawks
 Rangiriri Eels
 Huntly South
 College Old Boys
 Fairfield Falcons
 Otorohanga Tigers
 Taharoa Coast Steelers
 Hauraki Tigers
 Te Iti Rearea

Coastline
 Otumoetai Eels
 Tauranga City Sharks
 Te Paamu
 Te Puna
 Papamoa Bulldogs
 TePuke Tigers

Bay of Plenty

 Pikiao Warriors
 Ngongotaha Chiefs
 Rotorua Central Lions
 Taupo Phoenix
 Pacific Sharks
 Forestlands Falcons
 Kawerau Raiders
 tauhara te maunga
 Matakana Island Rebels

Western Alliance

Taranaki

 Western Suburbs /Tigers 
 Bell Block Marist /Dragons
 Waitara /Bears
 Hawera /Hawks
 Coastal /Cobras
 Normanby-Okaiawa /Knights
 Patea / Warriors

Manawatu

 Levin /Wolves- Wanderers- Taitoko United- Knights- Lions  
 Linton /Cobras
 Palmerston North /Kia Ora Warriors
 Otaki /Whiti Te Ra	
 Marton /Bears
 Foxton /Rebels
 Waiouru /Bobcats
 Ohakea /Magpies
 Dannevirke /Tigers
 Whanganui /Vikings - Boxon - Castlecliff /Seagulls
 City Titans
 Pahiatua Panthers
 Massey Mako
 Taihape /Mokai Patea
 Feilding /Falcons

Eastern Alliance

Hawkes Bay
 Bridge Pa sports club
 Maraenui Phoenix Rugby League
 EITSA
 Tapuae
 Te Rangatahi o Omahu
 Western Suburbs
 Flaxmere Falcons rugby league
 Otane sports club
 Clive Cougars

New Zealand
These are the Teams that have Registered in Gisborne Comps over the years, this update is 2012 .
 Manutuke Mustangs* Moana Toa* Paikea Whalers* Kaiti Devils
 Turanga Panthers* Gisborne United Bulldogs* Repongaere Eels  
 Mahaki Warriors* Whakaki Kirituna* Wairoa Tigers* Uawa Nasties
 Ruatoria Raiders+ Turanga Panthers+ Waengapu Stallions
+ Tapuae Taniwha+ Te Urewera Raiders+ Knights+ Kahawai
+ Seeka Falcons

Wellington

 Kapiti Bears (Raumati-Paraparaumu)
 Wainuiomata Lions
 Te Aroha Eels (Waiwhetu-Lower Hutt)			
 Upper Hutt Tigers (Trentham-Upper Hutt)
 Petone Panthers   (Petone) 
 University Hunters (Kelburn)
 Randwick Kingfishers (Naenae)
 St.George Dragons (Cannons Creek)
 North City Vikings (Ascot Park)
 Harbour City Eagles (Berhampore)
 Titahi Bay Marlins* 
 Harbour City Spiders*
(* denotes senior 1st division only)

Defunct clubs

 Miramar Roosters
 Marist Northern						
 Trentham
 Paremata Raiders
 Porirua City Phoenix
 Taita
 Eastern Suburbs Eagles (Rugby League Park, Newtown)
 Korodale
 Naenae
 Central
 Waterside
 Hutt

Tasman
 Richmond Rabbits
 Wanderers Wolves
 Stoke Cobras

West Coast
 Runanga
 Suburbs		
 Cobden-Kohinoor		
 Waro-Rakau
 Brunner
 Hokitika
 Marist

Canterbury

 Addington
 Aranui
 Ashburton
 Burnham
 Celebration
 Marist
 Halswell
 Hornby
 Kaiapoi
 Linwood
 Papanui
 Riccarton
 Rolleston
 Shirley
 Sydenham
 Woolston

Aoraki 

 Ashburton Barbarians 
 Chertsey Oilers
 Country Cowboys
 Timaru Outlaws

Southland

 Wakatipu Giants (Queenstown)
 He Tauaa
 Cooks
 Eastern Knights
 Leopards
 Bluff Steelers
 Lonestar
 City-INV
 Winton Warlords
 Mataura Warriors

Otago

 Kia Toa Tigers 1954–Present
 University Students 1954–Present
 Harbour Seals
 Bulldogs Rugby League
 South Pacific Raiders 1994–Present
 South City Dragons
 Dunedin Bears 2018 only
 Waitaki Warriors 2020–Present

See also

List of rugby league clubs in Australia
List of rugby league clubs in Britain
List of rugby league clubs in France

References

 
Clubs
New Zealand
Rugby